The 1978 Swedish Open – Singles event was part of the 1978 Swedish Open tennis tournament and was played on outdoor clay courts in Båstad, Sweden between 17 July and 23 July 1973. Corrado Barazzutti was the defending Swedish Open champion. First-seeded Björn Borg won the title by defeating second-seeded Barazzutti in the final, 6–1, 6–2.

Seeds

Draw

Finals

Top half

Bottom half

References

External links
 ITF tournament edition details

Men's Singles
Singles